Kilianów  is a village in the administrative district of Gmina Kąty Wrocławskie, within Wrocław County, Lower Silesian Voivodeship, in south-western Poland. Prior to 1945 it was in Germany.

The family of German Chancellor Leo von Caprivi moved here from Koprivnik, Slovenia after being ennobled by the Habsburgs.

References

Villages in Wrocław County